Dr. Aptullah Kuran (4 December 1927 – 1 April 2002) was a Turkish professor of Ottoman architecture and founding president of Boğaziçi University. After graduation from Robert College, he received his bachelor's and master's degrees in Architecture at Yale University and his doctoral degree in History of Art at Ankara University. He returned to Robert College in 1968, and became the first president of Boğaziçi University when Robert Yüksek was converted into a state university by Turkish authorities in 1971.

Aptullah Kuran is also the father of Duke University professor Timur Kuran, Suzan Kuran, and Melisa Kuran Fowler.

References

1927 births
2002 deaths
Rectors of Boğaziçi University
Robert College alumni
Yale University alumni
Turkish architects
Burials at Aşiyan Asri Cemetery